Appenweier station is a railway station in the municipality of Appenweier, located in the Ortenaukreis district in Baden-Württemberg, Germany.

It sits at the eastern end of the Appenweier–Strasbourg railway, whose western end, at Strasbourg, is in France.

References

Railway stations in Baden-Württemberg
Buildings and structures in Ortenaukreis